Love Addict may refer to:

 Love addiction, a human behavior in which people become addicted to the feeling of being in love
 "Love Addict" (Mika Nakashima song), a 2003 song by Japanese singer Mika Nakashima
 "Love Addict" (Vamps song), a 2008 song by Japanese band Vamps
 Love Addict (album), a 2011 album by Chinese pop singer Prudence Liew
 Love Addict, a 2016 film comedy featuring Courtney Stodden